Ribes echinellum, the Miccosukee gooseberry, is a very rare North American shrub in the currant family, native to the southeastern United States. It has only a few known populations. The Florida populations were discovered first, in 1924 at Lake Miccosukee. The South Carolina populations were found in 1957 and 1981, and the first is protected at Steven's Creek Heritage Preserve.

Ribes echinellum is a shrub up to 150 cm (5 feet) tall with spines at the nodes (places where the leaves are attached to the stem).  Leaves are round or egg-shaped with three lobes. It has whitish or pale yellow flowers and purple spine-covered berries.

Cultivation
Ribes echinellum is cultivated in a few places outside its native areas, as far south as Hudson, Florida, but does not reproduce there.

It is most abundant in the shade of deciduous trees on moist but well-drained soils with pH of 6.7 to 7.4.

References

External links
Nature in Focus photos
R. Todd Engstrom & Tom Radzio (2014) What's Eating the Fruit of the Miccosukee Gooseberry? Castanea: March 2014, Vol. 79, No. 1, pp. 27-31.  natural threats to the species

echinellum
Flora of Florida
Flora of South Carolina
Endemic flora of the United States
Plants described in 1924
Garden plants of North America
Drought-tolerant plants
Critically endangered flora of the United States